This article contains a list of Wikipedia articles about politicians in countries outside Japan who are of Japanese origin.

Argentina
 Mario Alberto Ishii - Mayor of José C. Paz Partido and Provincial Senator for Buenos Aires Province
 Laura Russo - National Deputy for Buenos Aires Province
 Alicia Terada - National Deputy for Chaco Province

Australia
 Rob Lucas – Treasurer of South Australia (1997-2002, 2018-2022)

Austria
 Richard von Coudenhove-Kalergi – founding president of the Paneuropean Union (1923–1972)

Brazil
 Luiz Gushiken – Minister of Social Communication and Strategic Management (2003–2005), President of the Workers' Party (1988–1990) and Federal Deputy for São Paulo (1987–1999)
 Walter Ihoshi – Federal Deputy for São Paulo (1996–2007)
 Kim Kataguiri – Federal Deputy for São Paulo
 Luiz Nishimori – Federal Deputy for Paraná 
 Keiko Ota – Federal Deputy for São Paulo
 Hatiro Shimomoto – State Deputy for São Paulo
 Hidekazu Takayama – Federal Deputy for Paraná

Canada
 Barry Morishita – Leader of the Alberta Party and former Mayor of Brooks, Alberta
 Bev Oda – Minister of International Cooperation (2007–2012) and Minister of Canadian Heritage and Status of Women (2006–2007)
 David Tsubouchi – Member of the Provincial Parliament of Ontario
 Naomi Yamamoto – Minister in the Provincial Government of British Columbia

Chile
 Carlos Ominami - Minister of the Economy (1990–1992)

China
 Koxinga - 17th-century warlord and ruler of the Kingdom of Tungning (1661-1662)
 Zheng Jing – Ruler of the Kingdom of Tungning (1662-1681)
 Zheng Keshuang – Ruler of the Kingdom of Tungning (1681-1683)
 Zheng Kezang – Crown Prince of the Kingdom of Tungning

Czechia
 Tomio Okamura - Deputy Speaker of the Chamber of Deputies and founder of the Dawn – National Coalition and Freedom and Direct Democracy Parties

Malaysia
 Fuad Stephens – Chief Minister (1963-1964 and 1976) and Yang di-Pertua Negeri (1973-1975 of Sabah and High Commissioner to Australia (1968–1973)

Marshall Islands
 Amata Kabua – 1st President of the Marshall Islands (1979–1996)
 Kunio Lemari – 2nd president of the Marshall Islands (1996–1997)
 James Matayoshi – Mayor of Rongelap Atoll
 Kessai Note – 3rd president of the Marshall Islands (2000–2008)

Mexico
 René Fujiwara – Federal Deputy for the Federal District
 Gilberto Hirata – Federal Deputy for Baja California and Mayor of Ensenada
 Pedro Kumamoto – State Deputy of Jalisco
 Jesús Kumate Rodríguez – Secretary of Health (1988–1994)

Micronesia
 Hirosi Ismael – Vice President (1987–1991)
 Manny Mori – 7th President of Micronesia (2007–2015)
 Masao Nakayama – Ambassador to Japan (1989–1997)
 Tosiwo Nakayama – 1st President of Micronesia (1979–1987)

Nauru
 Bernard Dowiyogo – President of Nauru (1976-1978, 1989-1995, 1996, 1998-1999, 2000-2001, 2003)
 Valdon Dowiyogo – Speaker of Parliament (2004–2007)

Nepal
 Takashi Miyahara – founder of the Nepal Rastriya Bikas Party

Netherlands
 Mariko Peters – Member of the House of Representatives

Norway
 Naomi Ichihara Røkkum – Substitute member of the Oslo City Council

Pakistan
 Hameeda Waheeduddin – Member of the Provincial Assembly of the Punjab

Palau
 Santy Asanuma – Senator
 Elias Camsek Chin - Vice President (2005–2009)
 Hersey Kyota - Ambassador to the United States 
 Kuniwo Nakamura - 6th President of Palau (1993–2001)
 Haruo Remeliik - 1st President of Palau (1981–1985)
 Peter Sugiyama – Senator

Peru
 Alberto Fujimori – President of Peru (1990–2000)
 Keiko Fujimori - Daughter of Alberto Fujimori, Congresswoman for Lima, President of Popular Force and three-time presidential candidate
 Kenji Fujimori - Son of Alberto Fujimori, Congressman for Lima
 Santiago Fujimori - Brother of Alberto Fujimori, Congressman for Lima
 Víctor García Toma - Minister of Justice (2010)
 Susana Higuchi - Former wife of Alberto Fujimori, Congresswoman for Lima
 Augusto Miyashiro - Mayor of Chorrillos District
 Rafael Yamashiro - Congressman for Ica Department
 Jaime Yoshiyama - President of the Democratic Constituent Congress (1992–1995)

Philippines
 Hori Horibata - Congressman for Camarines Sur

Russia
 Irina Khakamada – Deputy Chair of the State Duma (2000–2003)

Singapore
 Edmund W. Barker – Leader of the House (1968-1985), Minister for Law (1964-1988), Minister for National Development (1965-1975), Minister for Home Affairs (1972), Minister for the Environment (1975-1979) and Minister for Science and Technology (1977-1981)

Taiwan
 Sisy Chen - Member of the Legislative Yuan for Taipei
 Chiang Wei-kuo - Secretary-General of the National Security Council of the Republic of China (1986–1993)
 Liao Liou-yi - Secretary-General of the Kuomintang (2011–2012), Secretary-General of the Office of the President of the Republic of China (2009–2011) and Minister of the Interior (2008-2009)

United Kingdom
 Iain Duncan Smith - Conservative MP and Secretary of State for Work and Pensions (2010–2016)

United States

Cabinet
 Norman Mineta – Secretary of Commerce (2000–2001) and Secretary of Transportation (2001–2006); also U.S. Representative from California (1975-1995) and Mayor of San Jose (1971–1975)
 Eric Shinseki – Secretary of Veterans Affairs (2019-2014)

Congress
 Colleen Hanabusa – Representative from Hawaii
 S. I. Hayakawa – Senator from California
 Mazie Hirono – Senator from Hawaii
 Mike Honda – Representative from California
 Daniel Inouye - Representative and Senator from Hawaii; President pro tempore of the United States Senate (2010–2012)
 Bob Matsui – Representative from California
 Doris Matsui – Representative from California
 Spark Matsunaga - Representative and Senator from Hawaii
 Patsy Mink – Representative from Hawaii
 Pat Saiki – Representative from Hawaii
 Mark Takai – Representative from Hawaii
 Mark Takano – Representative from California

State and territory levels
 George Ariyoshi – 3rd Governor of Hawaii (1974–1986)
 David Ige – 8th Governor of Hawaii (2014–2022)
 Nelson Doi – 5th Lieutenant Governor of Hawaii (1974-1978) and President of the Hawaii Senate (1963-1964)
 Jean King – 6th Lieutenant Governor of Hawaii (1978-1982)
 Kazuhisa Abe – 12th Lieutenant Governor of Hawaii (2012-2018) and President of the Hawaii Senate (2010-2012)
 Steve Hobbs – 16th Secretary of State of Washington (2021–present)
 Earl Anzai – 12th Attorney General of Hawaii (1999-2002)
 Shan Tsutsui – President of the Hawaii Senate (1964-1965)
 Ron Kouchi – President of the Hawaii Senate (2015–present)
 Stan Matsunaka – President of the Colorado Senate (2001-2002)
 Scott Saiki – Speaker of the Hawaii House of Representatives (2017–present)
 Tommy Tanaka – Speaker of the Guam Legislature (1979–1983)
 Tom Takubo – Majority Leader of the West Virginia Senate (2019–present)
 Paul Bannai – Member of the California State Assembly
 Carol Fukunaga – Member of the Hawaii Senate and House of Representatives
 Warren Furutani – Member of the California State Assembly
 Bob Hasegawa – Member of the Washington Senate and House of Representatives
 Jani Iwamoto – Member of the Utah Senate
 Scott Kawasaki – Member of the Alaska Senate and House of Representatives
 Sam Kito III – Member of the Alaska House of Representatives
 Al Muratsuchi – Member of the California State Assembly
 George Nakano – Member of the California State Assembly
 Curtis Oda – Member of the Utah House of Representatives
 Richard Onishi – Member of the Hawaii House of Representatives
 Keiko Orrall – Member of the Massachusetts House of Representatives
 Dean Sanpei – Member of the Utah House of Representatives
 Sharon Tomiko Santos – Member of the Washington House of Representatives
 Jackson Sayama – Member of the Hawaii House of Representatives
 Brian Shiozawa – Member of the Utah Senate
 Monica Stonier – Member of the Washington House of Representatives
 Pat Takasugi – Member of the Idaho House of Representatives
 Chris Toshiro Todd – Member of the Hawaii House of Representatives
 Clift Tsuji – Member of the Hawaii House of Representatives
 Kip Tokuda – Member of the Washington House of Representatives
 Erika Uyterhoeven – Member of the Massachusetts House of Representatives
 Julie VanOrden – Member of the Idaho Senate and House of Representatives
 Glenn Wakai – Member of the Hawaii Senate and House of Representatives
 Dennis Yamada – Member of the Hawaii House of Representatives
 Mariko Yamada – Member of the California State Assembly
 Julie Yamamoto – Member of the Idaho House of Representatives
 Bernard Akana – Mayor of Hawaii County (1988-1990)
 Alan Arakawa – Mayor of Maui County (2003-2007, 2011-2019)
 Bruce Harrell – Mayor of Seattle (2017, 2022–present)
 James Kanno – Mayor of Fountain Valley, California
 Derek Kawakami – Mayor of Kauai (2018–present) and member of the Hawaii House of Representatives (2011-2016)
 Herbert Matayoshi – Mayor of Hawaii County (1974–1984)
 Kinjiro Matsudaira – Mayor of Edmonston, Maryland (1927, 1943)
 Ken Miyagishima – Mayor of Las Cruces, New Mexico
 S. Floyd Mori – Mayor of Pleasanton, California (1974–1975)
 Alan Nakanishi – Mayor of Lodi, California (2001–2002, 2012–2014)
 Eunice Sato – Mayor of Long Beach, California (1980–1982)
 Nao Takasugi – Mayor of Oxnard, California (1982–1992)
 Paul Tanaka – Mayor of Gardena, California (2005–2016)
 Larry Tanimoto – Mayor of Hawaii County (1990)
 Charmaine Tavares – Mayor of Maui County (2007–2011)
 Stephen K. Yamashiro – Mayor of Hawaii County (1992–2000)
 Paul Miyamoto – Sheriff of San Francisco (2020–present)

See also 
 List of heads of state and government of Indian origin
 List of foreign politicians of Chinese origin
 List of foreign politicians of Korean origin
 List of foreign politicians of Indian origin
 List of foreign politicians of Vietnamese origin
 List of foreign politicians of Iranian origin

References 

Politicians of Japanese descent
Lists of politicians